Augustine "Augi" Williams (born 3 August 1997) is a Sierra Leonean professional footballer who currently plays for Charleston Battery in the USL Championship and the Sierra Leone national football team.

Club career
Williams joined United Soccer League side Portland Timbers 2 on 3 August 2016. Additionally, he made his debut for the Portland Timbers in a U.S. Open Cup contest against Seattle Sounders FC on 13 June 2017, scoring Portland's lone goal in the 2-1 defeat.

After two seasons in Portland, Williams joined LA Galaxy II on 28 January 2019. On 30 April 2021, he was promoted to the LA Galaxy senior roster. In August, however, he signed on loan with San Diego Loyal of the USL Championship.

Following the 2021 season, William's contract option was declined by the Galaxy.

On 9 February 2022, Williams signed with USL Championship club Charleston Battery. Williams scored in his debut for the club, a match-winner against FC Tulsa on March 12. He scored his 50th career goal in the USL Championship regular season on August 12 in a 1-3 victory over New York Red Bulls II. The striker would lead the team in goals and set a new career-high with 16 goals, along with three assists. He additionally became the Battery's first double-digit goalscorer since 2018.

International career
Williams made his debut for Sierra Leone on 15 June 2021 in an Africa Cup of Nations qualifier against Benin.  On 30 December 2021, Williams was named to John Keister's final 28-man Sierra Leone squad for the 2021 Africa Cup of Nations. He was called up again for a pair of friendlies in September 2022 against South Africa and the Democratic Republic of the Congo, featuring in both games. Williams started another match on 19 November 2022 against the Algeria A' national football team.

Honors

Individual
USL Championship All-League First Team: 2020
USL Championship All-League Second Team: 2022

References

External links
Timbers 2 Profile

1997 births
Living people
Sierra Leonean footballers
Sierra Leone international footballers
Association football forwards
Sierra Leonean expatriate footballers
Portland Timbers 2 players
LA Galaxy II players
LA Galaxy players
San Diego Loyal SC players
Charleston Battery players
Sierra Leonean expatriate sportspeople in the United States
Expatriate soccer players in the United States
USL Championship players
Soccer players from California
2021 Africa Cup of Nations players
Major League Soccer players